Stalag I-B Hohenstein was a German World War II prisoner-of-war camp located  west of Hohenstein, East Prussia (now Olsztynek, Poland).

The camp was partially located on the grounds of the Tannenberg Memorial and initially included a set of wooden structures intended to house World War I veterans during German Nazi festivities.

Established in 1939 to house Polish soldiers captured in the course of the September Campaign, with time it was extended to house also Belgians, French, Italian, Serbian and Soviet soldiers. Harsh conditions, malnutrition, maltreatment and recurring typhoid epidemics led to many deaths among the prisoners. Notably during the winter of 1941–42 roughly 25,000 people died there, mostly Soviet soldiers.

It is estimated that altogether 650,000 people passed through this camp and its sub-camps. Between 50 and 55 thousand of them were buried in 500 mass graves at the Sudwa cemetery located nearby. The site is commemorated with a memorial stone by Ryszard Wachowski. Since 1980 the Olsztynek-based municipal museum hosts a small exhibition devoted to the camp and its inmates.

Parts of the former camp were uncovered during construction of the S7 Expressway.

References

External links 
 Plan of the camp at its greatest extent
 Aerial photo of the camp (Broken)

World War II prisoner of war camps in Germany
World War II sites in Poland